Frieri is an Italian surname. Notable people with the surname include:

Ernesto Frieri (born 1985), Colombian baseball player
Tiziano Frieri (born 1944), Italian footballer

See also
Frier

Italian-language surnames